Privolzhsky (masculine), Privolzhskaya (feminine), or Privolzhskoye (neuter) may refer to:
Privolzhsky District, various divisions in Russia
Privolzhsky Urban Settlement (or Privolzhskoye Urban Settlement), several municipal urban settlements in Russia
Privolzhsky (inhabited locality) (Privolzhskaya, Privolzhskoye), several inhabited localities in Russia